Stockbridge is a village in Ingham County in the U.S. state of Michigan. The population was 1,218 at the 2010 census.

Geography

Demographics

2010 census
As of the census of 2010, there were 1,218 people, 481 households, and 328 families living in the village. The racial makeup of the village was 96.7% White, 0.2% African American, 0.9% Native American, 0.2% Asian, 0.1% from other races, and 1.8% from two or more races. Hispanic or Latino of any race were 3.1% of the population.

There were 481 households, of which 39.9% had children under the age of 18 living with them, 46.4% were married couples living together, 17.0% had a female householder with no husband present, 4.8% had a male householder with no wife present, and 31.8% were non-families. 27.9% of all households were made up of individuals, and 12.3% had someone living alone who was 65 years of age or older. The average household size was 2.53 and the average family size was 3.09.

The median age in the village was 36.8 years. 29.4% of residents were under the age of 18; 8.2% were between the ages of 18 and 24; 23.4% were from 25 to 44; 26.6% were from 45 to 64; and 12.3% were 65 years of age or older. The gender makeup of the village was 46.8% male and 53.2% female.

2000 census
As of the census of 2000, there were 1,260 people, 480 households, and 322 families living in the village. The racial makeup of the village was 97.70% White, 0.79% Native American, 0.24% Asian, 0.48% from other races, and 0.79% from two or more races. Hispanic or Latino of any race were 1.03% of the population.

There were 480 households, out of which 35.8% had children under the age of 18 living with them, 52.5% were married couples living together, 10.8% had a female householder with no husband present, and 32.9% were non-families. 29.6% of all households were made up of individuals, and 14.0% had someone living alone who was 65 years of age or older.  The average household size was 2.53 and the average family size was 3.17.

In the village, the population was spread out, with 28.0% under the age of 18, 7.9% from 18 to 24, 30.5% from 25 to 44, 18.4% from 45 to 64, and 15.2% who were 65 years of age or older.  The median age was 35 years. For every 100 females, there were 83.1 males.  For every 100 females age 18 and over, there were 80.3 males.

The median income for a household in the village was $38,456, and the median income for a family was $47,250. Males had a median income of $40,625 versus $26,250 for females. The per capita income for the village was $17,614.  About 8.3% of families and 11.6% of the population were below the poverty line, including 17.0% of those under age 18 and 7.6% of those age 65 or over.

References

External links
Village of Stockbridge Website

Villages in Ingham County, Michigan
Villages in Michigan
Lansing–East Lansing metropolitan area
Populated places established in 1835
1835 establishments in Michigan Territory